Congestion management may refer to:
 Traffic congestion in transportation networks
 Network congestion in computer networks
 Transmission congestion in electrical grids